Pangaru (also Romanized as Pangarū and Pangroo) is a village in Sigar Rural District, in the Central District of Lamerd County, Fars Province, Iran. In the 2006 census, the population was 797, including 165 families.

References 

Populated places in Lamerd County